Héctor Epalza Quintero P.S.S. (4 June 1940 – 2 February 2021) was a Colombian Roman Catholic bishop.

Epalza Quintero was born in Colombia and was ordained to the priesthood in 1965. He served as bishop of the Roman Catholic Diocese of Buenaventura, Colombia from 2004 until 2017.

Notes

External links

1940 births
2021 deaths
21st-century Roman Catholic bishops in Colombia
Sulpician bishops
Roman Catholic bishops of Buenaventura